This section of the timeline of Romanian history concerns events from Late Neolithic (c. 3900 BC) until Late Antiquity (c. 400 AD), which took place in or are directly related with the territory of modern Romania.

Late Neolithic and Bronze Age (3800–1200  BC)

4th millennium BC 
 3900 BC – Bodrogkeresztúr-Gorneşti culture begins in Transylvania, as a continuation of Petreşti culture
 3700 BC – Cernavodă III culture begins in Danube Valley, as a continuation of Cernavodă I culture
 3500 BC – Copper Age begins and the areas of cultural influence start to expand again but without reaching the size of early Neolithic
 3500 BC – Cernavodă III culture begins in Dobruja, as a continuation of Cernavodă I culture
 3500 BC – Coţofeni culture begins in Transylvania as a continuation of Bodrogkeresztúr-Gorneşti culture
 3500 BC – Baden culture begins in Lower Tisza/Crişana as a continuation of Bodrogkeresztúr-Gorneşti culture

3rd millennium BC 
 3000–2800 BC – Climate becomes hotter and drier, affecting the human societies
 2750 BC – Cucuteni culture in eastern Romania comes to an end
 2700 BC – Transition from Copper Age to Bronze Age
 Proto-Indo-Europeans related to the Decea Mureşului culture penetrate in Transylvania coming from the Black Sea region
 Kostolac culture develops sporadically in Banat coming from modern day Serbia
 Vučedol culture (3000–2200 BC) develops in Banat and western Crişana also coming from Serbia
 2700–2000 BC – Proto-Indo-Europeans assimilate the local Eneolithic populations
 2300–1900 BC – Verbicioara culture develops in Oltenia, Banat and western Muntenia
 2100 BC – Otomani culture develops from a Baden culture background in a widespread area between the Mureş River, the Apuseni Mountains, and the Tisza River, up to modern-day Slovakia. It was characterized by fortified settlements and islands, the bronze deposits from Apa, Valea Chioarului in Transylvania, and Hajdúsámson in Hungary, the typical full handle swords and the axes with disc, the practice of inhumation, and later of cremation, and with the sanctuary of Sălacea

2nd millennium BC 

 2000 BC – Early Bronze Age starts
 Due to its richness in copper, Transylvania becomes one of the most important metallurgical centers in Europe
 Nir culture develops
 Glina III-Schneckenberg culture develops in Muntenia and extends into Oltenia and south eastern Transylvania; it is characterized by settlements on any terrain, and the practices of inhumation and incinerations in cists
 2000–1800 BC – Cucuteni B culture destroyed
 1700 BC
 Glina culture begins in Muntenia and Oltenia
 Otomani culture ends in Crişana
 1700–1300 BC Monteoru culture begins 
 1600 BC – Gârla Mare culture begins in Oltenia
 1500 BC – Middle Bronze Age starts
 Periam culture develops in southern Crişana, Banat, north-eastern Serbia and western Bulgaria; characterized by bronze jewelry and the practice of inhumation
 Pecica culture appears as a continuation of Periam culture and expands into the middle Danube, Tisa, and lower Mureş; brings moulds for casting weapons, crouched inhumation and the gold treasures from Pecica and Rovine
 Periam-Pecica/Mureş culture
 Sighişoara-Wietenberg culture develops from a Coţofeni culture background in the center and the Transylvanian Plain; characterized by fortified settlements with many weapons, pottery with spiral and meander motifs, bronze deposits, Boiu-type swords, Mycenaean swords from import, golden jewellery and axes (Ţufalău), the practice of cremation and much rarely of inhumation
 Vatina culture begins in western Banat, on lower Tisa and northern Serbia; defined by rare bronze objects
 Verbicioara culture expands into Oltenia, eastern Muntenia, Serbia and north-western Bulgaria, with fortified settlements and a limited number of bronze artefacts
 Monteoru culture expands from Muntenia into south-eastern Transylvania
 Tei culture  expands from Muntenia into south-eastern Transylvania
 Suciu de Sus culture spreads into northern Transylvania, Crisana, north-eastern Hungary and south-eastern Slovakia, practicing cremation
 Cruceni-Belegiš culture follows and replaces the Vatina culture in Serbia and western Banat; it is part of the Urnfield culture which moves from the middle Danube towards south-east; this advance leads to great dislocations of populations in the Balkan Peninsula, resulting in Dorian migration to the south, the destruction of Mycenaean civilization and expeditions of the Sea Peoples
 1300 BC – Late Bronze Age starts
 Sighişoara-Wietenberg culture extends into south-eastern Transylvania
 Tribes of shepherds appear from the east as the Noua culture; characterized by bronze deposits of Uriu-Domăneşti type and metal working
 1250–1125 BC – Transition to Iron Age: Uioara de Sus

Iron Age (1200 BC – 400 AD)

12th century BC 
 1200–500 BC – Early Iron Age/Hallstatt culture : Ferigile
 1150 BC – Gârla Mare culture ends in Oltenia

9th century BC 
 900–800 BC – Rafaila
 c. 800 BC – Basarabi culture begins in Muntenia, in connection with the Bosut culture, ethnically identified with Triballi or Daco-Getaes.

8th century BC 

 700–500 BC – Poiana, Galaţi (Piroboridava)
 c. 700 BC – Scythians arrive in the Carpathians

7th century BC 
 c. 600 BC – Basarabi culture ends, possibly due to arrival of the Scythian tribes
 657 BC or 625 BC – Histria founded

6th century BC 

 6th-5th century BC
 Tomis is founded
 Histria, temple of Zeus Polieus
 560 BC – Megara founds Heraclea Pontica
 Callatis founded by Heraclea Pontica, itself a colony of Megara
 c. 550 BC – Agathyrsi, a Thraco-Scythian people, build burial tombs around modern day Ciumbrud, in contrast with the surrounding people who practice incineration
 514 BC – Darius I led his Persian army over the Bosphorus and campaigns unsuccessfully against the Scythians on the Danube.
 513 BC – Darius subdues the Getae and east Thrace in his war against the Scythians.
 513 BC – first written evidence of tribes (Getae or Dacians) inhabiting the region by Herodotus

5th century BC 

 500–1 BC – Middle Iron Age/La Tène culture
 5th–4th century BC – A Getic settlement is found at Zimnicea
 470–460 – The king Charnabon reigns over the Getae 
 c. 450 BC – Democracy is imposed in Histria
 431–424 – Odrysian king Sitalces conquests the territory of modern Dobruja ruling over the local Getic tribes

4th century BC 

 Agighiol silver treasure
 Golden Helmet of Coţofeneşti
 Callatis wall
 Callatis papyrus grave
 364/363-353/352 BC – Clearchus, tyrant of Heraclea Pontica
 341 – King Cothelas, also known as Gudila, ruled over the Geto-Dacian tribes from modern Dobruja 
 348 BC – Philip II of Macedon against Thracians
 339 BC – Philip II against Scythians led by Ateas
 339 BC – A Getic ruler, referred as "Histrianorum Rex" and located near Danube, opposes resistance to Ateas' Scythian army 
 335 BC – Alexander III of Macedon crosses the Danube fighting with Dacian tribes led by basileus Moskon
 c. 335 BC – Dacian king Sarmis/Armis rules in Transylvania 
 326 BC – The Macedon general Zopyrion leads a campaign north of Black Sea against Getae but he is defeated and ultimately killed 
 313 BC – Histria revolts against Lysimachus of Thrace
 310–309 BC – Lysimachus besieges Callatis
 Late 4th century BC
 Histria, sacred area burnt
 Callatis, ustrinum
 4th–2nd century BC
 Histria, Hellenistic wall 
 Callatis, gilt terra-cotta miniatures

3rd century BC 

 King Zalmodegikos rules over Dobruja 
 Celts migrate to Transilvania and Oltenia 
 Poroina rython
 Histria, temple of Aphrodite
 Piscul Crăsanilor, Dacian settlement
 King Dromichaites rules over tribal unions in Romanian Plain 
 297 BC – Lysimachus make peace with Dromichaites 
 292 BC – Lysimachus fight against Getae and he is defeated and taken prisoner, perhaps in Piscul Crăsanilor
 281 BC – Lysimachus dies
 279 BC – Celts attack Histria and Delphi
 262 BC – Histria and Callatis war against Byzantium
 251 BC – Theoros from Callatis
 230–130 BC – Ciumeşti necropolis

2nd century BC 

 First half of 2nd century BC – the Dacian Kingdom was led by King Oroles
 200 BC – Callatis building inscription
 200–150 BC – Histria ephebe inscription
 2nd century? – Histria aqueduct
 2nd–1st century BC – Popeşti flourishes
 145–172 BC – Tilişca counterfeiter's coins
 110–72/71 BC – Mithridates controls Pontic cities
 109 BC – Dacians together with Scordisci attack Roman provinces situated south of Danube; attack repelled by M. Minucius Rufus

1st century BC 

 82 BC  – Burebista unifies the Dacians and Getae forming the first and largest Dacian Kingdom, on the territory of modern Romania and surroundings
 Early 80s BC – Burebista moves capital from Popeşti to Costeşti
 80 BC – 106 AD – Dacian citadels
 74 BC – Dacian Kingdom at its peak under King Burebista
 72-71 BC – War between Pontic cities, allied with Thracians, and Romans; Callatis treaty with Rome
 61 BC – Coalition of Greeks and barbarians (Getae and Bastarnae) defeats C. Antonius Hybrida at Histria
 c. 60 BC – Burebista leads a policy of conquest of new territories: he attacks and vanquishes the Celtic tribes of Boii and Taurisci dwelling along the Middle Danube (in what is now Slovakia)
 c. 57 BC –  Burebista conquers the Black Sea shore, subjugating the Greek fortresses from Olbia to Apollonia, as well as the Danubian Plain all the way to the Balkans.
 Burebista runs expeditions against a group of Celts who lived among the Thracians and Illyrians (probably the Scordisci)

 After 50 BC – Histria, "second founding"
 48 BC – Burebista sides with Pompey during his struggle against Julius Caesar in the Great Roman Civil War (49–45 BC), sending Akornion as an ambassador and a military adviser
 48 BC – Citizens of Dionysopolis dedicate an inscription to Akornion, which mention this citizens' friendship to Burebista, as well as a diplomatic mission to the Dacian town named Argedava or Argidava to possibly visit Burebista's father
 c. 45 BC – Caesar emerges as victor and plans on sending legions to punish Burebista
 44 BC
 On March 15 Caesar is assassinated in the Senate before he can start a campaign against the Dacian Kingdom
 Burebista is assassinated in a plot made by the tribal aristocracy, which felt that a consolidation towards a centralized state would reduce their power
 The Dacian Kingdom is dissolved, with the exception of the nucleus around the Orăştie Mountains, while the rest being divided into four different kingdoms
 42 BC – Geto-Dacian contingent with Brutus at the Battle of Philippi, fighting against Octavian and Mark Antony
 27 BC – Crassus triumphs over Geto-Dacians
 Augustus Caesar sends an army against the Geto-Dacians, finding the former state of Burebista divided into five states
 14 BC – 98 AD – Minor Dacian citadels flourish

1st century 

 6-12 AD – Sextus Aelius Catus destroys Muntenian towns
 9-17 AD – Ovid in exile at Tomis
 12 AD – Getae from Lower Moldavia attack Aegyssus and capture it temporarily; attack repelled by Odrysian king Rhoemetalces I and P. Vitellius 
 14 AD
 Barbarians attack Troesmis
 Dobruja becomes province of Moesia
 15-35 AD – C. Poppaeus Sabinus, governor of Moesia
 c. 20 AD – Strabo publishes his Geographica (Geography) giving a detailed account of the Dacian Kingdom at the time of Burebista in Book VII, Chapter 3 (Mysia, Dacia, and the Danube); he mentions that Getae and Dacians speak the same language, and makes important references to the high priest Deceneus and the teachings of Zalmoxis
 26 AD – Poppaeus Sabinus and L. Pomponius Flaccus crushes Dobrujan revolt of Thracians 
 c. 49 AD – Histria's fishing rights guaranteed
 54-68 AD – Noviodunum camp founded, during Nero's reign
 57-67 AD – Tiberius Plautius Silvanus Aelianus, governor of Moesia
 60-65 AD – Columella, agricultural writer, flourishes
 69 AD – Invasion of Dacians and Roxolans in Moesia, south of Danube; response of governor M. Aponinus Saturninus 
 c. 77 AD –  Pliny the Elder publishes his Naturalis Historia (Natural History), gives an account of the Dacians, noting that the Romans call the Getae, Daci
 81-96 AD – Bărboşi naval base founded during Domitian's reign
 Before 84 AD – Duras becomes King of the Dacians and consolidates the consolidate the core of Dacia around Sarmizegetusa
 84 AD – Diurpaneus reorganizes the Dacian army, and begins minor raids upon the heavily fortified Roman province of Moesia, on the southern course of the Danube river
 85 AD
 King Duras orders more vigorous attacks into Moesia, raids being led by Diurpaneus
 Led by Diurpaneus the Dacians cross the Danube, wreak considerable havoc and kill the Moesian governor Oppius Sabinus.
 After this attack, the Roman emperor Domitian personally arrives in Moesia accompanied by a large force commanded by Cornelius Fuscus, and possibly bases himself in Naissus
 Summer 85 AD – Praetorian prefect Fuscus  and Funisulanus Vettonianus successfully drives the Dacians back across the border
 Autumn 85 AD – Domitian returns to Rome and celebrates the tenth and eleventh salutations for driving out the invaders
 85-89 AD – Hadrian commands Legio V Macedonica
 86 AD
 Domitian celebrates a triumph in Rome between March 17 and May 15 for the victory over the Dacians
 Domitian reorganizes the province of Moesia into Moesia Inferior and Moesia Superior, and plans a future attack into Dacia.
 87 AD
 Cornelius Fuscus leads five or six legions across the Danube into Dacia on a bridge of ships
 The Roman legions are ambushed at Tapae and face disaster with complete destruction of Legio V Alaudae (see First Battle of Tapae)
 Cornelius Fuscus dies in the battle, the battle standard of the Praetorian Guard is lost and the Dacians capture Roman flags and war machines
 Rome must pay tribute to the Dacians in exchange for a vague recognition of Rome's importance.
 King Duras knowingly offers the kingship to Diurpaneus as a recognition of his diplomatic, military and leadership skills
 Diurpaneus dubbs himself Decebalus, meaning "with the strength of ten [men]" or simply "The Brave," and is crowned king of Dacia
 88 AD
 The Roman offensive into Dacia continues, with general Tettius Iulianus in command
 The army starts from Viminacium following the same route Cornelius Fuscus had in the previous year and heads towards Sarmizegetusa, the capital of Dacia
 In Rome, Domitian celebrates the Secular Games and possibly plans a trip to the Danube to accept Dacians' surrender in person
 Late 88, a battle takes place mainly in the same area, at Tapae, and this time the Romans are victorious
 Facing a difficult road to Sarmizegetusa and for fear of falling into a trap, Iulianus abandons the offensive
 Decebalus sues for peace but Domitian refuses
 89 AD
 Domitian attacks the Germanic Suebi tribes of Marcomanni and Quadi, possibly as a punitive action since the Germanics did not provide assistance in the Dacian conflict
 After Marcomanni defeat the Romans in Pannonia and Rome faces wars on two fronts, Domitian comes in person to the Danube and accepts the peace with the Dacians
 Later in the year, Decebalus sends Diegis, general, member of the Dacian royal family and brother of Decebalus, to Rome to accept the diadem from Domitian and the generous settlement
 Decebalus becomes a client king of Rome, he receives money, craftsmen and war machines to protect the empire's borders
 For Domitians' achievements in Dacia, the Roman Senate decrees a huge equestrian statue, impressive games take places and throughout the empire statues are erected
 after 89 AD
 Instead of using the money as Rome intended, Decebalus builds new citadels in the mountains, in important strategic points, and reinforces the existing ones.
 92 AD
 A coalition of Dacians and Rhoxolani Sarmatians completely slaughter the Legio XXI Rapax at Tropaeum Traiani, modern Romania, in the First Battle of Adamclisi
 Angustia diploma
 96 AD – In September, Domitian is assassinated, one potential reason being the unfavorable peace with Decebalus

2nd century 

 101-102 AD – First campaign of Emperor Trajan against Dacians
 Romans build castra at Drobeta, Sucidava, Romula, Dierna, Tibiscum, Bucium (Orăştioara), Arcidava, Centum Putei, Berzobis, Micia, Gilău, Bologa(?), Buciumi, Tihău-Odorhei line, Mălăeşti (Sfârleanca), Drajna de Sus, Angustia(?), Bumbeşti, Răcarii de Jos
 105 AD – Drobeta, stone camp
 105-106 AD – Second Dacian War
 Limes Alutanus: Buridava, Slăveni, Arutela 
 Romans build camps at Potaissa, Napoca, Porolissum, Ulmetum; Danube limes
 Apulum municipium
 106 AD
 Battle of Sarmisegetusa
 South-western Dacia is annexed to the Roman Empire as the Province of Dacia
 107-109 AD – The road Dierna – Ulpia Traiana Sarmizegetusa – Apulum – Potaissa – Napoca – Porolissum is built 
 108-110 AD – Ulpia Traiana Sarmizegetusa founded
 109 AD – Tropaeum Traiani, trophy and town
 112 AD – Legio V Macedonica at Troesmis
 113 AD – Trajan's Column is dedicated in Rome
 117 AD – Iazyges and Roxolans attack Dacia; Dacia's governor C. Iulius Quadratus Bassus dies in battle; Bridge of Apollodorus on fire 
 117-138 AD – Reign of Hadrian
 Mălăeşti (Sfârleanca), Drajna de Sus, Târgşor abandoned
 Rădăcineşti castra is built
 Răcari castra rebuilt in stone
 118 AD
 Hadrian visits Dobruja
 Apulum becomes seat of government of Dacia
 119 AD
 First administrative reorganization of Dacia under Hadrian 
 Consolidation of Limes Alutanus 
 Begin the creation of Limes Transalutanus 
 120 AD – Diploma from Porolissum mentioning the governor of Dacia Superior, Cn. Minucinus Faustinux Sex. Iulius Severus
 124 AD
 Dacia divided into three provinces
 Hadrian visits Dobruja and Napoca
 Napoca and Drobeta become municipia
 131-67 AD – Alburnus Maior gold mines flourish
 132 AD – Ulpia Traiana amphitheater built
 133 AD – Gherla diploma mentioning Flavius Italicus as military commander of Dacia Porolissensis 
 138-161 AD – Reign of Atoninus Pius
 Moors garrison Răcari
 Dobruja flourishes
 Capidava, a customs-station
 138-222 AD – Hobiţa villa rustica flourishes
 143 AD
 Attack of free Dacians; repelled by Roman troops 
 Căşei camp
 148 AD – Gilău camp rebuilt
 before 150 AD – Orheiul Bistriţei, military tile kiln
 156-157 AD – Attack of free Dacians; repelled by M. Statius Priscus, legatus of Dacia Superior 
 157 AD
 Consolidation of Someș limes 
 Arcidava, Micia, stone camps
 Porolissum amphitheater rebuilt in stone
 158 AD – Ulpia Traiana amphitheater repaired
 160 AD – Invasion of Costoboci 
 161-180 – Marcus Aurelius' reign
 160-170 AD – Tomis, idealized head of girl
 162-172 AD, 177-180 – Marcomannic War
 Ulpia Traiana suburban villas burned
 Slăveni camp destroyed
 Citera camp at Porolissum rebuilt in stone
 167-168 AD
 Legio V Macedonica transferred from Troesmis to Potaissa
 Apulum military headquarters for all Dacia
 Last administrative reorganization of Dacia 
 170 AD – Tropeum Traiani mentioned as municipium 
 180-193 AD Commondus' reign
 Napoca colony
 No-man's-land on northwest frontier
 180-183 AD – Sucidava customs-station
 183-184 AD – The generals D. Clodius Albinus and C. Pescenninus Niger fight successfully against free Dacians 
 193-211 AD – Septimius Severus
 Limes Transalutanus built
 Fourteen camps Flămânda-Cumidava, including Jidava
 Apahida villa rustica
 Romula: brick circuit-wall, curia
 193-198 AD – Drobeta, Romula, Apulum, Porolissum, Dierna, Ampelum are made colonies
 195 AD – Potaissa baths enlarged

3rd century 

 201 AD – Bumbeşti camp rebuilt in stone
 202 AD – Severus in Dobruja
 204 AD – Micia, Moors' temple
 205 AD – Slăveni castra rebuilt
 211-217 AD – Carcalla
 Mănerau villa rustica
 Potaissa colony
 Bologa and Buciumi rebuilt
 212 AD – Decree of universal citizenship
 213 AD
 Caracalla visits Porolissum
 Limes Porolissensis rebuilt 
 215 AD – Last evidence of Roman gold mining
 217 AD – Macrinus honored by Histria
 217-222 – AD Elagabalus
 Bucium (Orăştioara) camp walls repaired
 222-235 AD – Severus Alexander
 Council of Three Dacias meets at Ulpia Traiana
 Ad Mediam camp restored
 Micia amphitheater goes out of use
 229 AD – Dio Cassius consul
 230-40 AD – Arutela, last coins
 235-38 AD
 Maximinus Thrax  fights against Iazyges and free Dacians 
 Road repairs in Dobruja
 238-244 AD – Gordian III
 Potaissa basilica
 Carpi invade Dobruja
 244-49 AD – Philip the Arab
 Carpi raid Ricari, Jidava
 Limes Transalutanus abandoned
 Sucidava, stone circuitwall
 Bumbeşti, last coins
 246 AD – Right to mint bronze coins 
 247 AD – Millennium of Rome celebrated
 248 AD
 Romula mentioned as colonia, circuit wall, third phase
 Goths invade Moesia; Histria is destroyed 
 249-251 – Decius
 251 AD
 Porolissum (Pomet) camp repaired
 Decius dies in battle
 253 AD – Tibiscum mentioned as municipium 
 256 AD – End of monetary emissions in Dacia 
 260-268 AD – Gallienus
 Ulpia Traiana, Porolissum, latest coins
 Goths sack Tibiscum
 Usurper Regalianus claims descent from Decebalus
 263 AD – Sarmatians burn Callatis extramural quarter
 267 AD 
 Attack led by Goths and Heruli in Dobruja ; Histria sacked
 Wall rebuilt
 268-70 AD – Claudius Gothicus
 Goths attack Tomis
 Claudius beats them at Naissus
 270-75 – Aurelian
 271 AD – Dacia officially abandoned; retreat of Roman occupation of Dacia
 275-76 Tacitus: detachment of Legio XIII Gemina at Desa (to 305)
 284-305 AD – Diocletian
 Dinogetia citadel
 Capidava rebuilt
 295 AD – Goths destroy Tropaeum Traiani
 3rd-4th century AD – Târgşor, Sarmatian necropolis

4th century 
 303-304 AD Anti-Christian persecutions; martyrdom in Scythia Minor (Dobruja) 
 306-337 AD Constantine I
 Drobeta, Sucidava Ulmetum, Axiopolis camps rebuilt
 Tomis, mosaic building
 315-316 AD – Attack of Goths and Carpi; repelled by Constantine the Great 
 316 AD – Tropaeum Traiani rebuilt
 317 AD – Constantine's son Crispus appointed Caesar
 324-28 – Constantiniana Dafne fortress is built 
 324-30 AD – Constantinople built
 324-361 AD Constantius II
 Tomis renamed for him (?)
 328 AD Romula milestone
 Sucidava and Constantiana Daphne bridges
 331-332 AD – Gothic attack of south Danube provinces; repelled by Constantine the Great 
 332 AD – Goths and Taifals become foederati 
 337 AD Capidava rebuilt
 340-60 AD Barbarians transferred en masse into Dobruja
 361-63 AD Rebuilt and consolidation of Danube limes 
 364-75 AD Valentinian
 Coins at Porolissum
 364-378 AD – Valens
 367 AD
 Constantiniana Daphne and Noviodunum bridges
 Pietroasa treasure
 368-69 AD Orthodox bishop Betranion opposes Arianism imposed by emperor Valens 
 375 AD – Huns sack Dinogetia
 376 AD – Huns defeat Ostrogoth Kingdom and attack Visigoths 
 379 – 395 Theodosius I
 Coins at Apulum, Porolissum
 Biertan Christian inscription
 381 AD – Carps are mentioned for the last time 
 383-408 AD Arcadius
 Coins at Dierna

End of ancient history in Romania 
The date used as the end of the ancient era is entirely arbitrary. Not all historians agree on the ending dates of ancient history, which frequently falls somewhere in the 5th, 6th, or 7th century. Western scholars usually date the end of ancient history with the fall of Rome in AD 476, the death of the emperor Justinian I in AD 565, or the coming of Islam in AD 632 as the end of ancient European history.

See also 
 Timeline of ancient history
 Bronze Age in Romania
 Dacia
 Roman Dacia

Notes

References

Ancient

Modern

External links 

Ancient history of Romania
Ancient
Romania